Christian Cantamessa (born October 4, 1976) is an Italian-American writer, director, and video game creator best known as lead designer and co-writer of Red Dead Redemption and the Manhunt series, level designer on Grand Theft Auto: San Andreas, and writer of Middle-earth: Shadow of Mordor.

He is also the founder and CEO of Sleep Deprivation Lab, which is a production company and video game consulting firm known for work on Rise of the Tomb Raider, The Crew, Forza Horizon, Middle-earth: Shadow of Mordor, and Middle-earth: Shadow of War.

He also was the director and writer of Air, a feature film released in 2015 starring Norman Reedus, Djimon Hounsou, and Sandrine Holt.

In December 2020 it was revealed that Cantamessa is working on story, world-building and cinematic direction for the reboot of Perfect Dark with Xbox's The Initiative studio.

Works

Video games

Film

Comics

References

External links
 
 

1974 births
21st-century American screenwriters
21st-century Italian screenwriters
American male screenwriters
American video game designers
Italian male screenwriters
Italian video game designers
Living people
People from Savona
Red Dead
Video game writers